National Institute of Advanced Manufacturing Technology (NIAMT) formerly known as the National Institute of Foundry and Forge Technology (NIFFT) is a premier public engineering and research institution in Ranchi.

It was established in 1966 by the Government of India in collaboration with UNDP – UNESCO to provide qualified engineers and specialists for running foundry and forge industries. It is an autonomous and Centrally Funded Technical Institute (CFTI) by Ministry of Education (MOE), Government of India.

The institute offers postdoctoral, doctoral and master's program at the graduate level and bachelor's program and advanced diploma courses at the undergraduate level. The objectives of the institute have broadened to meet the present need of the industries, with the introduction of departments of Manufacturing Engineering in 1985, Materials and Metallurgical Engineering in 1998 , Mechanical Engineering in 2020 and Electronics and Computer Engineering in 2021.

Apart from training students, NIAMT also provides consultancy, documentation and information retrieval services in manufacturing engineering, industrial metallurgy and in foundry and forge sectors.

Location
Located in Hatia, which is about 7.4 km from Ranchi.
Distance from Ranchi Airport: 6 km
Distance from Ranchi Railway Station: 10 km
Distance from Hatia Railway Station: 1.1 km and 140 km from Chaibasa.

History 
In consonance with the general guidelines of UNESCO (1962) regarding establishment of specialized institutes, National Institute of Foundry and Forge Technology (NIFFT) was created in 1966 under the UNDP program to cater to the need of a large number of technicians in industry. The particular emphasis was on foundry and forge technology to meet the demand of trained manpower in the primary metal manufacturing sectors like automobile, heavy engineering, machine and component manufacturing etc. Two carefully designed advanced diploma courses, namely foundry and forge technology, were offered.

In view to push forward the knowledge boundary, four M.Tech programs were introduced in the core areas of foundry and forge technology. Subsequently, two B.Tech. programs, one in Manufacturing engineering in 1992, and other in Metallurgical and materials engineering in 1998. The courses were affiliated to the Ranchi University. The affiliation was later granted by the Jharkhand University of Technology from 2018. In 2020, Manufacturing Engineering was replaced by Mechanical Engineering. However, as of 1 July 2021, the university grants commission has approved the institute for the Deemed University status under section 3 of the UGC Act, 1956. 

In 2022, two new Btech courses Computer Engineering and Production and Industrial Engineering is introduced to reinforce the core framework of foundry and forging technology with the knowledge of materials and manufacturing to cater the emerging need of the industries. The doctoral program for manufacturing engineering began in 2006.

The institute currently offers doctorates in 5 departments, 4 master's degrees, 4 bachelor's degrees and 2 advanced diploma courses. The Institute is planning to introduce a Mtech programme in Computer Engineering from the academic year 2023-24.

NIFFT celebrated its golden jubilee year in 2016 with the chief minister of Jharkhand, Raghubar Das, assuring to promote it to the status of an institute of national importance.

In 2021, name of the Institution was changed from ' National Institute of Foundry and Forge Technology ' to ' National Institute of Advanced Manufacturing Technology '.

Organization

The institute is registered as a society under the Indian Societies Registration Act of 1860. The management of the institute is vested with a board of governors with a chairman at its apex and members representing the Government of India (Ministry of Education and Industry), All India Council for Technical Education (AICTE), private and public enterprises, technical and R&D institutions. The institute received technical and financial assistance during its formative period in the form of UNESCO fellowships, experts services, and laboratory equipment.

Campus
The NIAMT campus is located on NH-75 around 7.2 km from Ranchi.

It is located in the town of Hatia.

It houses the administrative building, academic buildings and halls of residence for students. The faculty residential area, grounds, library, auditorium, laboratories and workshops are other areas on its well maintained campus.

Hostels
NIFFT has five boys hostels namely Nirala Chatrawas, Homi J. Bhabha Chatrawas, J. C. Bose Chatrawas, M. Visvesvaraya Chatrawas,  Vikram A. Sarabhai Chatrawas and one girls' hostel, Kalpana Chawla Chatrawas, whose total holding capacity is around 1200 students, in single-bed and double-bed rooms in ADC, B.Tech., M.Tech., and PhD courses. Each hostel has sports facilities such as TT tables, football ground, basketball ground, badminton court, cricket ground, carrom boards and volleyball courts apart from the common college facilities.

Nirala Chatrawas, J. C. Bose Chatrawas and M. Visvesvaraya Chatrawas have canteens inside the hostel. The other hostels also have a student's mess and canteen nearby.

Sports facilities
The college provides sporting facilities to its students for their all-round development. These include a cricket ground, basketball court, volleyball courts, table tennis, football and shuttle badminton.

Computer facilities
The institute provides many computer facilities. These include software like DEFORM, PROCAST, UNIGRAPHICS, CATIA, AUTODESK Inventor Professional (Mechanical and Electrical), MATLAB and also servers, desktops, workstations and terminals. CAD Center/Computer Center and the E-library provide students with internet access.

Laboratories
The institute has well equipped laboratories and workshop for carrying out practical study work by the students and for extending testing facilities pertaining to foundry, forge, metallurgical analysis and materials characterization to the outside organizations on payment basis. The institute houses laboratories such as sand laboratory, metallography laboratory, flexible manufacturing system (FMS) laboratory, non-destructive and mechanical testing  laboratory, composite laboratory, spectroscopy laboratory, environmental monitoring and pollution control laboratory, metrology laboratory, and a forging laboratory. The institute also houses workshop buildings which include carpentry, foundry and forge shops as well as graphics rooms and other laboratories.

Departments
NIAMT has the following six departments:
Department of Mechanical and Manufacturing Engineering
Department of Metallurgy and Materials Engineering
Department of Electronics and Computer Engineering
Department of Foundry Technology
Department of Forge Technology
Department of Applied Sciences and Humanities

Academics 
The institute conducts educational programmes leading to the award of Advanced Diploma Course Certificates (ADC), Bachelor of Technology (B.Tech.), Master of Technology (M.Tech.) and Doctor of philosophy (PhD).

Admissions 
For admission into the Advanced Diploma Courses (ADC), the institute self conducts examination. The undergraduate students for Bachelor's degree at the institute are selected through the competitive exam, Joint Entrance Examination.
For Master of Technology (M.Tech.) courses admission is through Graduate Aptitude Test in Engineering (GATE). For the PhD course, admission is through interview held at campus at the beginning of every semester.

Rankings

The National Institutional Ranking Framework (NIRF) ranked it 115 among engineering colleges in 2021. In 2022, NIAMT ranked 150th in NIRF Engineering category.

Life at NIAMT
NIAMT has many student clubs which conduct many technical and cultural events throughout the year. These include the SAC (Students Activity Centre), SAE Club, NIAMT Cricket Club, Football club, The NIAMT Ensemble (Music Club), Anagha (Dance and Drama club), Nukkad Team, Photography Club, etc.

College fests
Jinks-Pranav is the annual youth cultural cum techno-management festival organised by the Students'Gymkhana committee of NIAMT, held in last of February every year. The festival spans three days and comprises more than forty events. In Jinks Pranav 2017, the main attraction was Lagori band, DJ Tejas, Tulsi Kumar.

Umeed
Umeed is a social welfare program that aims to help the poor and unfortunate survive the harsh winter by donating them clothes. Started in 2015 with the motto "For it is in giving that we receive" by the students of NIAMT, the program helped more than five hundred people of Ranchi in its first edition. The year 2016 saw the involvement of another educational institution from Ranchi, Central University of Jharkhand, in this social work. The collection and distribution of the clothes is managed by the student from the institutions. The cloth collection drive will be starts from mid October and will extend through the month till the first week of November. The distribution of the clothes will take place after the collected clothes have been sorted and filtered according to their fitness to be worn. On 13 November 2016 the clothes were distributed in various orphanages and old age homes in Ranchi. Cultural events for orphaned children on 14 November 2016, on the occasion of Children's day was also held at NIAMT, Ranchi.

In popular culture
Parts of the Punjabi movie Dakuaan Da Munda were shot at NIAMT.

References

External links
Official website
 

Engineering colleges in Jharkhand
All India Council for Technical Education
Ranchi district
Educational institutions established in 1966
1966 establishments in Delhi
Universities and colleges in Jharkhand